Fabio Cerutti (born 26 September 1985 in Turin) is an Italian sprinter who specializes in the 100 metres.

Biography 
He finished sixth in 60 metres at the 2007 European Indoor Championships. He also competed at the 2008 World Indoor Championships and the 2008 Olympic Games without reaching the final round. In Beijing he finished 5th in his heat in 10.49 seconds. Together with Simone Collio, Emanuele di Gregorio and Jacques Riparelli he also took part in the 4 x 100 metres relay, but they were disqualified in the first round. His personal best time is 10.13 seconds, achieved in July 2008 in Cagliari.

He equalled the Italian record of 6.55 seconds for 60m at the Italian indoor championships on 22 February 2009 winning his semi-final, however, he was disqualified in the final due to a false start and it was eventually won by Simone Collio. At the European Indoor Championships in Turin, Cerutti finished second to Dwain Chambers in a time of 6.56. His teammate, Emanuele Di Gregorio, also ran a 6.56 earning him the bronze medal. He competed at the 2009 World Championships in Athletics, reaching the quarterfinals stage of the 100 m.

National titles
He won 4 national championships at individual senior level.
Italian Athletics Championships
100 metres: 2008, 2012, 2015
Italian Indoor Athletics Championships
60 metres: 2014

See also
 Italian all-time lists - 100 metres
 Italy national relay team

References

External links
 

1985 births
Living people
Italian male sprinters
Athletes (track and field) at the 2008 Summer Olympics
Athletes (track and field) at the 2012 Summer Olympics
Olympic athletes of Italy
Sportspeople from Turin
Athletics competitors of Fiamme Gialle
Mediterranean Games bronze medalists for Italy
Athletes (track and field) at the 2009 Mediterranean Games
World Athletics Championships athletes for Italy
Mediterranean Games medalists in athletics
Italian Athletics Championships winners